Escape to Nowhere is the fourth studio album by American heavy metal band Omen. It was originally released in 1988 via Metal Blade Records.

It is the first Omen album with Coburn Pharr on vocals (later an Annihilator member), replacing J.D. Kimball. Cam Daigneault had replaced Steve Witting on drums before the album's release, but all drums tracks used in the album are played by Witting.

Escape to Nowhere is the first Omen album to feature keyboards.

Track listing

Personnel
Omen
 Coburn Pharr – vocals
 Kenny Powell – guitars
 Jody Henry – bass
 Steve Wittig – drums

Additional musicians
 Bob Kinkel – keyboards
 Paul Silver – additional guitar on "Radar Love"
 Cam Daigneault – drums (replaced Steve Witting after the album's recording)
 Chris Holly – guitar (North American tour)

Production
 Paul O'Neill – production, arrangements
Omen – arrangements
James Ball – engineer 
Jon Goldwater – management
Gary Smith – cover painting
Wendy Kramer – Design

References

1988 albums
Omen (band) albums
Metal Blade Records albums
Albums produced by Paul O'Neill (rock producer)